Scoliacma xuthopis is a moth in the family Erebidae. It was described by George Hampson in 1914. It is found in Australia, where it has been recorded from Western Australia.

References

Moths described in 1914
Lithosiina